The 1967 Oak Lawn tornado outbreak was a destructive tornado outbreak and severe weather event that occurred on April 21, 1967, across the Upper Midwest, in particular the towns of Belvidere and Oak Lawn, Illinois.  Locally known as 'Black Friday,' it was the largest tornado outbreak of 1967 and one of the most notable to ever occur in the Chicago metropolitan area.  The outbreak produced numerous and significant (F2+) tornadoes, with ten of them in Illinois alone.  Included was one of just six documented violent (F4/F5) tornadoes in the Chicago metropolitan area since the area was first settled.

Meteorological synopsis

April 21, 1967, was a warm Friday afternoon in northern Illinois. Following a foggy morning with temperatures in the middle 50s°F, temperatures rose rapidly in the afternoon as low geopotential heights approached from the southwest. A warm front—part of a very deep shortwave trough—passed through Illinois all day and by afternoon moved north of the state. As a low-pressure area within an extratropical cyclone approached the area, temperatures rose into the low to mid 70s°F with dew points rising into the 60s°F, an upper-level jet reaching , and increasing low-level vertical shear. Meanwhile, a persistent mesolow feature near Joliet, Illinois, helped to maintain backed low-level winds from the south. As conditions became more favorable for tornadoes and supercells began developing in the Chicago area, the regional U.S. Weather Bureau office issued a tornado watch at 1:50 p.m. CDT covering the northern half of Illinois plus southern Wisconsin, eastern Iowa, and western Indiana. By 3 p.m. CDT/2100 UTC, more than 12 tornadoes had already been spawned from the storm system.

Confirmed tornadoes

Belvidere, Illinois

The F4 tornado that struck the Belvidere-Harvard-Woodstock area was responsible for one of the highest tornado-related death tolls in a single school building ever recorded when it struck Belvidere High School as multiple school buses were being loaded. At 3:50 P.M., a violent multiple vortex tornado, later given an F4 rating, moved through Belvidere, Illinois, damaging the high school and overturning buses. A total of 24 people were killed with 13 them of dead in Belvidere at Belvidere High School, making this tornado the sixth deadliest ever to hit a school. 410 people were injured as well and 127 homes destroyed with another 379 being damaged.  The Belvidere tornado was especially devastating because it hit the school just as students were getting on the buses to go home. Just before 4 p.m. CST, the tornado reached the school. Twelve buses, already filled with elementary- and middle-school students, were tossed about. Several of the students were tossed into adjacent fields and killed. A bus driver was killed as well. Shortly after the passing of the tornado, faculty and some of the stronger students used the fireproof doors of the high school as stretchers to carry the injured into the cafeteria, the severely injured into the library, and the dead into the gymnasium. Four hundred cars (three hundred new cars and 100 employee cars) were destroyed at the Chrysler plant in town. A school bus driving south of Harvard was thrown into power lines and torn in half. The driver and students survived by sheltering in a ditch.

Lake Zurich, Illinois

The second violent tornado of the day in Illinois may have developed as far southwest as Elgin but was first observed at about 5:00 p.m. CDT near Fox River Grove, though its path is officially believed to have begun near Middlebury. It then produced a discontinuous damage path through Fox River Grove, North Barrington, and Lake Zurich. The Acorn Acres subdivision, northeast of and adjourning Lake Zurich Manor, reported scattered damage and debris with about 12 homes severely damaged. According to official plots from Storm Data, the tornado lifted after hitting Acorn Acres, though non-tornadic damages to trees and buildings occurred as far as the intersection of Illinois Route 63 and Gilmer Road. There, severe winds, possibly downbursts, destroyed four homes, one brewery, and a plastic-manufacturing site, though at least one source indicates that the tornado was likely still present at that place. In all, the tornado killed one person, and damaged 400–500 homes and destroyed about 100 other homes. An air-conditioning unit weighing  was thrown . Cars were picked up and tossed as well.

Oak Lawn–Evergreen Park–Chicago South Side, Illinois

The third tornado to affect Illinois this day was also the deadliest tornado of the entire outbreak. The F4 tornado that swept through Palos Heights, Oak Lawn, Hometown, Evergreen Park, and skipped through Chicago's Southside, killed 33 people. It dissipated at Rainbow Beach on Lake Michigan. 

An intense supercell with a hook echo on weather radar first appeared at 4:45 p.m. Minutes later, severe thunderstorm winds blew out windows in a building, though no tornado or funnel cloud had yet occurred. At 5:24 p.m. CDT, a tornado touched down at the present-day campus of Moraine Valley Community College and moved east-northeast, mainly at 70° heading. As it touched down, the tornado bent power poles and blew down small trees and vegetation, tossing dirt as it went. Subsequently, the intensifying funnel severely damaged homes and a drive-in theater in a half-block-wide area of Chicago Ridge.

As it passed through the business district of Oak Lawn, the tornado leveled many homes that were built entirely of brick. In Oak Lawn, the tornado threw 25–40 vehicles from the intersection of Southwest Highway and W. 95th St. (US-12/20), killing 16 people who were stuck in traffic during the rush hour. At the same intersection, the tornado destroyed the gym at Oak Lawn Community High School, including the locker room to which the students had been evacuated. Though none were killed, several students were injured. Seven shoppers were killed across the street when the roof of a grocery store collapsed on them.

This tornado ended up being the deadliest of the outbreak. It destroyed the brick pro shop at Beverly Country Club at 87th and Western Avenue, trapping several people who suffered only minor injuries. As it moved beyond Evergreen Park, the tornado weakened and widened as it caused lighter damage to vegetation, roofs, and garages. In all, the tornado killed 33 people, including several children at a roller skating rink, and injured 1,000. It destroyed 152 homes and damaged 900, causing $50 million in damage. The destroyed buildings included a high school, grocery store, tavern, market, motel, drive-in theater, restaurant, numerous apartments, and two gas stations. Additionally, the tornado caused numerous fires in Oak Lawn which were quickly extinguished.

Recovery difficulties
Just two days after the outbreak, three inches (76 mm) of snow fell on Belvidere, which only exacerbated the cleanup from Friday's tornadoes. In fact, many cities and towns in the Midwest broke record overnight lows on April 24 and 25. A state of emergency was declared for Boone County, and the reserves came to assist in the cleanup effort.

Legacy
The tornado has its own section in the Oak Lawn Public Library.

See also
List of North American tornadoes and tornado outbreaks
List of tornado-related deaths at schools
1990 Plainfield tornado

References

External links 
 ComPortOne article on the Belvidere Tornado
 Chicago area remembers 30th anniversary of tornado outbreak (USA Today)
 The Oak Lawn, Illinois Tornado (Storm Track)
 Map of April 21, 1967, tornadoes
 RRStar.com's tribute
 40th Anniversary of Northern Illinois’ Worst Tornado Disaster (NWS Chicago)
 Federal Disaster Declaration (Federal Emergency Management Agency)
 Personal Memories Of The Oak Lawn Tornado
 Oak Lawn tornado outbreak. Funnels of Destruction. WGN-TV news coverage.

Oak Lawn Tornado Outbreak
Belvidere, Illinois
Boone County, Illinois
Cook County, Illinois
F4 tornadoes by date
Oak Lawn,1967-04-21
McHenry County, Illinois
Oak Lawn, Illinois
Tornadoes in Illinois
Oak Lawn Tornado Outbreak